Artýom Nazarow is a Turkmen football midfielder who played for Turkmenistan in the 2004 AFC Asian Cup. He also played for Nisa Asgabat and Mordovia Saransk.

References

External links

Living people
Turkmenistan footballers
Turkmenistan international footballers
Association football midfielders
1977 births
Footballers at the 2002 Asian Games
Turkmenistan people of Armenian descent
FC Mordovia Saransk players
Asian Games competitors for Turkmenistan